Alicante 7, also known as RSGC5, (Red Supergiant Cluster 5) is an open cluster rich in red supergiants found in the Scutum-Crux Arm of the Milky Way Galaxy, along with RSGC1, Stephenson 2, RSGC3, Alicante 8, and Alicante 10. Alicante 7 contains 7 red supergiants, making it one of the most massive open clusters known.

Notes

References

Scutum (constellation)
Open clusters
Scutum–Centaurus Arm